George Hamilton "Hammy" Baker (July 25, 1893 – January 21, 1937) was a Canadian professional ice hockey player. He played for the Calgary Tigers of the Western Canada Hockey League after serving in World War I. He also played for the Calgary Wanderers of the Big-4 League in Alberta and for the Winnipeg Victorias of the Manitoba Hockey Association.

An insurance man in later life, Baker died of suddenly of a heart attack a hospital in St. Boniface, Manitoba, after admitting himself due to "foot troubles". He was buried at St. John's Cemetery in St. Boniface.

References

External links

1893 births
1937 deaths
Calgary Tigers players
Canadian ice hockey right wingers
Canadian military personnel of World War I
Ice hockey people from Winnipeg
Winnipeg Victorias players